Acrobasis ochrifasciella is a species of snout moth in the genus Acrobasis. It was described by Hiroshi Yamanaka in 2006 and is endemic to Japan.

References

Moths described in 2006
Acrobasis
Endemic fauna of Japan
Moths of Japan